Peter Van Loan  (born April 18, 1963) is a former Canadian politician who served as the Member of Parliament for the electoral district of York—Simcoe from 2004 to 2018. He was the Leader of the Government in the House of Commons from 2007 to 2008 and again from 2011 to 2015.

Biography

Born in Niagara Falls, Ontario, Van Loan is of Estonian heritage on his maternal side. His mother and grandparents fled Estonia during World War II and immigrated to Canada.

Van Loan was educated at the University of Toronto and York University and holds a bachelor's degree, a Masters in International Relations and an additional master's degree in geography. Van Loan graduated from York University's Osgoode Hall Law School and was admitted to the Bar of Ontario in 1989.

Prior to his election to public office, Van Loan was a partner and Chair of the Planning and Development Law Group at the law firm of Fraser Milner Casgrain LLP in Toronto, Ontario. Van Loan was also an Adjunct Professor of Planning at the University of Toronto.   He served as president of the Progressive Conservative Party of Ontario during Mike Harris' term of office and then of the Progressive Conservative Party of Canada for a brief period.  He resigned from the latter post in 2000 after a series of disagreements with its leader, Joe Clark.

Van Loan was a key figure in the unsuccessful attempt to convince Premier of New Brunswick Bernard Lord to run for the leadership of the federal Progressive Conservatives in late 2002. He was a key organizer in the "Yes" Campaign, led by Tory Leader Peter MacKay, to ratify the merger of the Progressive Conservative Party and the Canadian Alliance into the Conservative Party of Canada.  Van Loan then again attempted to recruit Lord to run for the leadership of the new party, and again was unsuccessful.

In an article from January 24, 2008, Van Loan was classified as one of "Harper's 12", the twelve most influential people in Ottawa, by Maclean's Magazine. Other cabinet ministers included were Jim Prentice, John Baird, and Jim Flaherty.

On October 30, 2008, Jay Hill replaced Van Loan as Government House Leader and Steven John Fletcher took over the Minister for Democratic Reform post. Van Loan became the Minister for Public Safety, as Stockwell Day became the Minister of International Trade. On these changes Don Martin wrote: "The House of Commons might become a slightly friendlier place now that Peter Van Loan has lost the job of Question Period cheap shot specialist to become Public Safety Minister, a good move that seems to back Harper’s pledge to play nice with others during the upcoming session."

On January 19, 2010, Prime Minister Stephen Harper designated Van Loan as the next Minister of International Trade.

On December 5, 2012, on the floor of the House of Commons Van Loan was involved in an altercation with NDP Leader Tom Mulcair. Van Loan crossed the aisle and used an inappropriate word during the confrontation. He was restrained by Defence Minister Peter MacKay.

Van Loan was one of thirteen Canadians banned from travelling to Russia under retaliatory sanctions imposed by Russian President Vladimir Putin in March 2014. In response to the ban, Van Loan said that the ban was "not of serious consequence" and that he would "not be losing sleep over being on the list."

On July 29, 2018, Van Loan announced that he would be retiring from politics. He retired from the House of Commons on September 30. In the by-election, his seat was held for the Conservatives by candidate Scot Davidson.

Electoral record

References

External links

 

 Peter Van Loan on how Ottawa can help businesses abroad
 Van Loan 'erred' in prison transfer requests
 Come to Canada!: Van Loan

1963 births
University of Toronto alumni
Members of the 28th Canadian Ministry
Members of the King's Privy Council for Canada
Members of the House of Commons of Canada from Ontario
Conservative Party of Canada MPs
Lawyers in Ontario
York University alumni
People from Niagara Falls, Ontario
People from Georgina, Ontario
Canadian people of Estonian descent
Living people
Recipients of the Order of the Cross of Terra Mariana, 2nd Class
Osgoode Hall Law School alumni
Presidents of the Progressive Conservative Party of Ontario